Eileen Kennedy-Moore is a Princeton, New Jersey-based clinical psychologist and the author or co-author of books for parents, children, and mental health professionals. She serves on the advisory board for Parents magazine and blogs about children's feelings and friendships on PsychologyToday.com. She has also blogged for PBS Parents and U.S. News & World Report. She is the creator of Dr. Friendtastic, a cartoon superhero offering friendship advice for kids.

Education
Kennedy-Moore earned her bachelor's degree at Northwestern University and her masters and doctorate at Stony Brook University (State University of New York at Stony Brook). Her academic publications include articles in Review of General Psychology, Motivation and Emotion,  and Journal of Personality and Social Psychology.

Books and videos
Expressing Emotion: Myths, Realities and Therapeutic Strategies, . Kennedy-Moore, E. & Watson, J. C. (1999). Guilford Press (for mental health professionals)
The Unwritten Rules of Friendship: Simple Strategies to Help Your Children Make Friends, . Elman, N. M. & Kennedy-Moore, E. (2003), Little, Brown (for parents)
What About Me? 12 Ways to Get Your Parents' Attention (Without Hitting Your Sister), . Kennedy-Moore, E. & Katayama, M. (illus.) (2005), Parenting Press (for children ages 4–6)
Smart Parenting for Smart Kids: Nurturing Your Child's True Potential, . Kennedy-Moore, E. & Lowenthal, M. (2011). Jossey-Bass/Wiley (for parents)
Raising Emotionally and Socially Healthy Kids, . Kennedy-Moore, E. (2014)
Growing Friendships: A Kid's Guide to Making and Keeping Friends   Kennedy-Moore, E. & McLaughlin, C. (2017), Beyond Words/Aladdin/Simon & Schuster (for elementary school children)
What's My Child Thinking? Practical Psychology for Modern Parents, For Ages 2-7   Kennedy-Moore, E. (contributing editor) & Carey, T. (2019), Dorling Kindersley (for parents)
Kid Confidence: Help Your Child Make Friends, Build Resilience, and Develop Real Self-Esteem    Kennedy-Moore, E. (2019), New Harbinger (for parents). The book received a starred review from Kirkus and was selected as a "favorite" book of 2019 by Berkeley's Greater Good. 
Growing Friendships During the Coronavirus Pandemic: A Kids' Guide to Staying Close to Friends While Being Apart Kennedy-Moore, E. & McLaughlin, C. (2020), Beyond Words (for elementary school children)

References 

21st-century American psychologists
American women psychologists
Northwestern University alumni
Stony Brook University alumni
Year of birth missing (living people)
Living people
21st-century American women